The Embassy of the United States in Paris is the diplomatic mission of the United States in the French Republic. The embassy is the oldest diplomatic mission of the United States. Benjamin Franklin and some of the other Founding Fathers were the earliest United States Ambassadors to France. The chancery building is located at 2 , on the northwest corner of the Place de la Concorde, in the 8th arrondissement of Paris.

Buildings
The U.S. State Department owns three buildings in Paris to support its diplomatic, consular, trade and cultural activities, which are: the chancery building, the Hôtel de Talleyrand and the Hôtel de Pontalba (ambassador's residence). More details about the latter two buildings can be found in the Secretary of State's Register of Culturally Significant Property.

Chancery
The four-story chancery building, housing the ambassador's office, faces Avenue Gabriel and the gardens of the Champs-Élysées; it is beside the Hôtel de Crillon. It was built in 1931, following the demolition of an existing building, the Hôtel Grimod de La Reynière.  Designed by Delano & Aldrich – an American architectural firm based in New York City, New York – along with French architect Victor Laloux, the building has a façade that conforms with other buildings on the Place de la Concorde, as required by French law.

Hôtel de Talleyrand

The , also called the Talleyrand building, at 2 rue Saint-Florentin formerly housed the American Embassy Consular Services, Public and Cultural Affairs offices, several other government agencies, and the George C. Marshall Center. Most of these offices were subsequently moved to the chancery building.  Constructed in 1769 as a private residence, the property was acquired in 1812 by Charles Maurice de Talleyrand, who owned it until his death in 1838. It was then purchased by the banker James Mayer de Rothschild, whose family owned it for over a century, until 1950, when it was acquired by the U.S. government.

Ambassador's residence

The nearby property at 41 rue du Faubourg Saint-Honoré, known as the Hôtel de Pontalba, was built by Louis Visconti for the New Orleans–born  Baroness Micaela Almonester de Pontalba between 1842 and 1855. Edmond James de Rothschild acquired the building in 1876. His estate sold it in 1948 to the U.S. government, and today it is the residence of the U.S. Ambassador to France.

U.S. representatives in France

As of 18 December 2017, sixty-six people had represented, in France, the interests of the United States (or individual states prior to the 1789 ratification of the U.S. Constitution) as envoy, minister plenipotentiary, minister, ambassador or chargé d'affaires.

See also 
 Diplomatic rank
 France – United States relations
 French Embassy, Washington, D.C.
 List of diplomatic missions of the United States
 Place des États-Unis

References

External links

 

Buildings and structures in the 8th arrondissement of Paris
United States
Paris
France–United States relations